Birgir Sigurðsson (born 4 September 1965) is an Icelandic former handball player who competed in the 1992 Summer Olympics.

References

1965 births
Living people
Birgir Sigurdsson
Birgir Sigurdsson
Handball players at the 1992 Summer Olympics